The Faustino Miranda Botanical Garden is located next to the Sabinal River, in Tuxtla Gutiérrez. It is in the state of Chiapas, in southern Mexico.

History 

The botanical garden was founded in 1951 under the trusteeship of Dr. Faustino Miranda who dedicated the greater part of his life to studying the flora of the state of Chiapas.

Features 

The Faustino Miranda Botanical Garden features here are exhibits on the wood of Chiapas, medicinal plants, the flowers of chiapas, and many more.  There is also a library specializing in botany.

See also 

 List of natural history museums in Mexico

References 

  Página de Turismo de Tuxtla Gutiérrez. Last accessed November 20, 2006.
  Jardin Botanico Dr. Faustino Miranda - Botanic Gardens Conservation International, visiting information
 Página de Turismo de Tuxtla Gutiérrez.
 https://web.archive.org/web/20070817185137/http://carn.ua.es/CIBIO/es/publicaciones.html
 https://web.archive.org/web/20070609133520/http://www.ecologia.edu.mx/publicaciones/NOVEDADES.htm
 https://web.archive.org/web/20070606205929/http://www.ecologia.edu.mx/publicaciones/LIBROS_archivos/Faustino_Miranda.pdf
 Palacios-Rios, M. & J. Carrillo. 2007. Faustino Miranda un botánico español apasionado por la flora mexicana. CIBIO-Universidad de Alicante-Instituto de Ecología, A.C., Alicante, España 184 pp.

Botanical gardens in Mexico
Natural history of Chiapas
1951 establishments in Mexico
Protected areas of Chiapas
Museums in Chiapas
Natural history museums in Mexico
Tuxtla Gutiérrez